Waterford Historic District may refer to:

Waterford Historic District (Waterford, Maine), listed on the National Register of Historic Places in Oxford County, Maine
Waterford Historic District (Waterford, Virginia), a National Historic Landmark and listed on the National Register of Historic Places in Loudoun County, Virginia
Waterford Village Historic District (Waterford, New York), listed on the National Register of Historic Places listings in Saratoga County, New York